Elections in Islamabad are conducted by the Election Commission of Pakistan. Islamabad is the only Federal Territory of Pakistan which is not part of any Province. Islamabad is administered by the Metropolitan Corporation of Islamabad. Islamabad is Represented by 3 MNA's in National Assembly and 4 Senators which include one technocrat/Ulema and one Woman.

Political Parties 
Pakistan Tehreek-e-Insaf (PTI), Pakistan Muslim League Nawaz (PML-N) are main political parties in Islamabad. Jamat-e-Islami (JI) and Pakistan People's Party (PPP) also has minor support in the Territory.

General Elections 

From 1977 to 1997 Islamabad was represented in the National Assembly of Pakistan by one Constituency NA-35 Islamabad. From 2002 to 2013 Islamabad had 2 National Assembly constituencies NA-48 Islamabad-I and NA-49 Islamabad-II. From 2018 onward Islamabad is represented by 3 National Assembly Constituencies NA-52 Islamabad-I, NA-53 Islamabad-II, NA-54 Islamabad-III. Below table shows winners of each constituency:

Election Maps (1977-2018)

Local Elections 
Local Elections are conducted in Islamabad to elect the Metropolitan Corporation of Islamabad. Islamabad is divided into 50 Union Councils . Each Union Council sends one chairman and Vice Chairman to the Metropolitan Corporation. 9 Women, 2 Minority Members, 2 Workers/Peasants, 2 Youth and 1 Technocrat are indirectly elected by the Metropolitan Corporation. Chairman and Vice Chairman of Majority party becomes Mayor and Deputy Mayor of Islamabad Respectively. Each Union Council is divided into 6 wards and each Union Council elects 6 Councilors, 2 Women Councilors, one Minority and one Youth Councilor.

References 

Government of Islamabad
Islamabad